The Rott is a  river in Bavaria, Germany, left tributary of the Inn. Its source is in the municipality Wurmsham in Lower Bavaria, between Landshut and Waldkraiburg. It flows east through a rural area with small towns, including Neumarkt-Sankt Veit, Eggenfelden, Pfarrkirchen and Pocking. It flows into the Inn near Neuhaus am Inn, opposite of Schärding, on the border with Austria.

See also
List of rivers of Bavaria

References

Rivers of Bavaria
Rivers of Germany